This is a list of Ghanaian Twenty20 International cricketers.

In April 2018, the ICC decided to grant full Twenty20 International (T20I) status to all its members. Therefore, all Twenty20 matches played between Ghana and other ICC members after 1 January 2019 will be eligible to have T20I status.

This list comprises all members of the Ghana cricket team who have played at least one T20I match. It is initially arranged in the order in which each player won his first Twenty20 cap. Where more than one player won his first Twenty20 cap in the same match, those players are listed alphabetically by surname. Ghana played their first T20I match on 20 May 2019 against Namibia at the ICC T20 World Cup Africa Qualifier Finals.

Key

List of players
Statistics are correct as of 9 December 2022.

References 

T20I cricketers
Ghana